Kand Dam is small earth core rock-fill dam in North Waziristan Agency of FATA, Pakistan.

The construction of dam started in 2011 and was expected to be complete by September 2014 with projected cost of PKR 198.145 Million. Due to military operations, construction of the dam was suspended in June 2014 at 86% progress. It was eventually completed in December 2016.

See also
 List of dams and reservoirs in Pakistan

References

Dams in Pakistan
Buildings and structures in Khyber Pakhtunkhwa
Rock-filled dams
Dams in Khyber Pakhtunkhwa